Echeveria carnicolor is a species of flowering plants of family Crassulaceae, endemic to Veracruz, Mexico.

Description 
Echeveria carnicolor have a very flat rosettes with gray-purple and green color. The rosettes have  diameter wide. The flowers color are red and orange

References 

carnicolor